A Twenty20 International (T20I) is a form of cricket, played between two of the international members of the International Cricket Council (ICC), in which each team faces a maximum of twenty overs. The matches have top-class status and are the highest T20 standard. The game is played under the rules of Twenty20 cricket. The first Twenty20 International match between two men's sides was played on 17 February 2005. England played their first Twenty20 International match against Australia on 13 June 2005, and this list of records start with that match. England have won the ICC Men's T20 World Cup on two occasions, in 2010 and 2022.

Key
The top five records are listed for each category, except for the team wins, losses, draws and ties, all round records and the partnership records. Tied records for fifth place are also included. Explanations of the general symbols and cricketing terms used in the list are given below. Specific details are provided in each category where appropriate. All records include matches played for England only, and are correct .

Team records

Overall record

Team results by opposition

Team scoring records

Most runs in an innings
The highest innings total scored in T20Is has been scored twice. The first occasion came in the match between Afghanistan and Ireland when Afghanistan scored 278/3 in the 2nd T20I of the Ireland series in India in February 2019. The Czech Republic national cricket team against Turkey during the 2019 Continental Cup scored 278/4 to equal the record. The highest score for England is 241/3 scored against New Zealand during the England's tour of New Zealand in 2019.

Fewest runs in an innings
The lowest innings total scored was by Turkey against Czech Republic when they were dismissed for 21 during the 2019 Continental Cup. The lowest completed score in T20I history for England is 80 scored against India in the 2012 ICC World Twenty20.

Most runs conceded an innings
The first T20I of Australia's tour of England in 2013 saw England concede their highest innings total of 248/6.

Fewest runs conceded in an innings
The lowest score conceded by England for a full inning is 45 when they dismissed West Indies during their tour of West Indies in 2019 at Warner Park, Basseterre, Saint Kitts and Nevis.

Highest match aggregate
The highest match aggregate scored in T20Is came in the match between India and West Indies in the first T20I of the August 2016 series at Central Broward Regional Park, Lauderhill when India scored 244/4 in response to West Indies score of 245/6 to lose the match by 1 run. The 2016 World Twenty20 game against South Africa saw a total of 459 runs being scored, the most involving England.

Lowest match aggregate
The lowest match aggregate in T20Is is 57 when Turkey were dismissed for 28 by Luxembourg in the second T20I of the 2019 Continental Cup in Romania in August 2019. The lowest match aggregate for a match involving England is 111, during the 2021 T20 World Cup when England dismissed West Indies for 55 runs.

Result records
A T20I match is won when one side has scored more runs than the runs scored by the opposing side during their innings. If both sides have completed both their allocated innings and the side that fielded last has the higher aggregate of runs, it is known as a win by runs. This indicates the number of runs that they had scored more than the opposing side. If the side batting last wins the match, it is known as a win by wickets, indicating the number of wickets that were still to fall.

Greatest win margins (by runs)
The greatest winning margin by runs in T20Is was Czech Republic's victory over Turkey by 257 runs in the sixth match of the 2019 Continental Cup. The largest victory recorded by England was during the England's tour of West Indies in 2019 by 137 runs.

Greatest win margins (by balls remaining)
The greatest winning margin by balls remaining in T20Is was Austria's victory over Turkey by 104 balls remaining in the ninth match of the 2019 Continental Cup. The largest victory recorded by England was during the 2021 T20 World Cup when the defeated West Indies by 6 wickets with 70 balls remaining.

Greatest win margins (by wickets)
A total of 22 matches have ended with chasing team winning by 10 wickets with New Zealand winning by such margins a record three times. England have won a T20I match by this margin on two occasions.

Highest successful run chases
Australia holds the record for the highest successful run chase which they achieved when they scored 245/5 in response to New Zealand's 243/6. England's highest innings total while chasing is 230/8 in a successful run chase against South Africa at Wankhede Stadium, Mumbai during the 2016 ICC World Twenty20.

Narrowest win margins (by runs)
The narrowest run margin victory is by 1 run which has been achieved in 15 T20I's with England winning such games once.

Narrowest win margins (by balls remaining)
The narrowest winning margin by balls remaining in T20Is is by winning of the last ball which has been achieved 26 times. England has achieve victory of the last ball twice.

Narrowest win margins (by wickets)
The narrowest margin of victory by wickets is 1 wicket which has settled four such T20Is. England have won a match by this margin once.

Greatest loss margins (by runs)
England's biggest defeat by runs was against India in the 2012 ICC World Twenty20 at Ranasinghe Premadasa Stadium, Colombo, Sri Lanka during the same match when they recorded their lowest complete inning total.

Greatest loss margins (by balls remaining)
The largest defeat suffered by England was against Australia in New Zealand during the 2017–18 Trans-Tasman Tri-Series when they lost by 7 wickets with 33 balls remaining against Australia at the MCG.

Greatest loss margins (by wickets)
England have lost a T20I match by a margin of 9 wickets on four occasions.

Narrowest loss margins (by runs)
The narrowest loss of England in terms of runs is by 1 run suffered once.

Narrowest loss margins (by balls remaining)
England has suffered loss off the last ball twice.

Narrowest loss margins (by wickets)
The smallest margin of defeat by wickets suffered by England is 3 wickets in February 2016 during the England's tour of South Africa in 2015–16.

Tied matches 
A tie can occur when the scores of both teams are equal at the conclusion of play, provided that the side batting last has completed their innings.
There have been 19 ties in T20Is history with England involved in two such games, both of which they won in a Super Over.

Individual records

Batting records

Most career runs
A run is the unit of scoring in cricket. A run is scored when the batsman hits the ball with his bat and with his partner runs the length of the pitch.
India's Virat Kohli has scored the most runs in T20Is, with 4,008 runs . Jos Buttler is the leading English batsmen on this list.

Highest individual score
The third T20I of the 2018 Zimbabwe Tri-Nation Series saw Aaron Finch score 172 runs, the highest individual score in T20Is. Alex Hales holds the English record with his century against Sri Lanka during the 2014 ICC World Twenty20

Highest individual score – progression of record

Highest career average
A batsman's batting average is the total number of runs they have scored divided by the number of times they have been dismissed.

Most half-centuries
A half-century is a score of between 50 and 99 runs. Statistically, once a batsman's score reaches 100, it is no longer considered a half-century but a century.

Virat Kohli of India has scored the most half-centuries in T20Is with 37. Jos Buttler has the most half-centuries for England, with 19.

Most centuries
A century is a score of 100 or more runs in a single innings.

Rohit Sharma has scored the most centuries in T20Is with 4. Four players have each scored a single century for England.

Most sixes

Most fours

Highest strike rates
Suryakumar Yadav of India holds the record for the highest strike rate, with a minimum of 250 balls faced as qualification, with 179.07. Liam Livingstone is the English batsman with the highest strike rate.

Highest strike rates in an innings
Dwayne Smith of West Indies strike rate of 414.28 during his 29 off 7 balls against Bangladesh during 2007 ICC World Twenty20 is the world record for highest strike rate in an innings. Moeen Ali, with his innings of 39 off 11 balls against South Africa in February 2020 during the England's tour of South Africa in 2019–20, holds the top position for an England player in this list.

Most runs in a calendar year
Mohammad Rizwan of Pakistan holds the record for most runs scored in a calendar year, with 1326 runs scored in 2021. Jos Buttler scored 589 runs in 2021, the most for England batsmen in a single year.

Most runs in a series
The 2014 ICC World Twenty20 in Bangladesh saw Virat Kohli set the record for the most runs scored in a single series scoring 319 runs. He is followed by Tillakaratne Dilshan with 317 runs scored in the 2009 ICC World Twenty20. Jos Buttler has scored the most runs in a series for England batsmen, when he scored 269 runs in the 2021 ICC Men's T20 World Cup.

Most ducks
A duck refers to a batsman being dismissed without scoring a run.
Ireland's Kevin O'Brien has had the misfortune to get out without scoring on 12 occasions. Luke Wright and Moeen Ali, with 9, have the most ducks for England.

Bowling records

Most career wickets
A bowler takes the wicket of a batsman when the form of dismissal is bowled, caught, leg before wicket, stumped or hit wicket. If the batsman is dismissed by run out, obstructing the field, handling the ball, hitting the ball twice or timed out the bowler does not receive credit.

, Tim Southee of New Zealand is the highest wicket-taker in T20Is with 129. Chris Jordan is the highest-ranked English bowler with 95 wickets.

Best figures in an innings
Bowling figures refers to the number of the wickets a bowler has taken and the number of runs conceded.
Nigeria's Peter Aho holds the record for best figures in an innings when he took 6/5 against Sierra Leone in October 2021. Sam Curran took five wickets for 10 runs against Afghanistan in the 2022 T20 World Cup, the best figures for an England player.

Best figures in an innings – progression of record

Best career average
A bowler's bowling average is the total number of runs they have conceded divided by the number of wickets they have taken.
Germany's Elam Bharathi holds the record for the best career average in T20Is with 12.56. Graeme Swann, with an average of 12.29, is the highest ranked English bowler.

Best career economy rate
A bowler's economy rate is the total number of runs they have conceded divided by the number of overs they have bowled.
Uganda's Frank Nsubuga, holds the T20I record for the best career economy rate with 4.87. Graeme Swann, with a rate of 6.36 runs per over conceded over his 39-match T20I career, is the highest Englishman on the list.

Best career strike rate
A bowler's strike rate is the total number of balls they have bowled divided by the number of wickets they have taken. The top bowler with the best T20I career strike rate is Sandeep Lamichhane of Nepal with a strike rate of 11.7 balls per wicket. Mark Wood has the lowest strike rate among English bowlers.

Most four-wickets (& over) hauls in an innings
Pakistan's Umar Gul, Shakib Al Hasan of Bangladesh and Rashid Khan have all taken four or more wickets on six occasions, the most among all international bowlers. Chris Jordan and Adil Rashid are the only two players for England to have taken four wickets more than once.

Best economy rates in an innings
The best economy rate in an innings, when a minimum of 12 balls are delivered by the bowler, is Sri Lankan player Nuwan Kulasekara economy of 0.00 during his spell of 0 runs for 1 wicket in 2 overs against Netherlands at Zohur Ahmed Chowdhury Stadium in the 2014 ICC World Twenty20. Adil Rashid holds the English for his spell of 2 runs for 4 wickets in 2 overs and 2 balls against West Indies in the 2021 T20 World Cup at Dubai.

Best strike rates in an innings
The best strike rate in an innings, when a minimum of 4 wickets are taken by the player, is by Steve Tikolo of Kenya during his spell of 4/2 in 1.2 overs against Scotland during the 2013 ICC World Twenty20 Qualifier at ICC Academy, Dubai, UAE. Chris Jordan has the best strike rate among English bowlers, with a spell of 4/6 in 2 overs.

Worst figures in an innings
The worst figures in a T20I came in the Sri Lanka's tour of Australia when Kasun Rajitha of Sri Lanka had figures of 0/75 off his four overs at Adelaide Oval, Adelaide. The worst figures by an English player are those of 0/60 that came off the bowling of Stuart Broad in the 2007 ICC World Twenty20 at Kingsmead, Durban, South Africa.

Most runs conceded in a match
Kasun Rajitha also holds the dubious distinction of most runs conceded in a T20I during the aforementioned match. James Anderson, with figures of 1/64 off his four overs against Australia in January 2007, holds the most runs conceded record for England.

Most wickets in a calendar year
Ireland's Josh Little hold the records for most wickets taken in a year, with 39 wickets in T20Is in 2022. Sam Curran, with 25 wickets in 2022, is the leading English bowler in this regard.

Most wickets in a series
The 2021 ICC Men's T20 World Cup Africa Group A Qualifier in Rwanda saw the record set for the most wickets taken by a bowler in a T20I series, when Ugandan bowler Dinesh Nakrani tool 21 wickets in the 6 matches he played in the series. Sam Curran took 13 wickets during the 2022 ICC Men's T20 World Cup, the most for an English bowler in a series.

Wicket-keeping records
The wicket-keeper is a specialist fielder who stands behind the stumps being guarded by the batsman on strike, and is the only member of the fielding side allowed to wear gloves and leg pads. Many players have played matches both as a wicket-keeper and as a regular fielder; in the records below, the number of innings refers to those where the player was the nominated wicket-keeper, and the number of catches only include those taken as a wicket-keeper.

Most career dismissals
A wicket-keeper can be credited with the dismissal of a batsman in two ways, caught or stumped. A fair catch is taken when the ball is caught fully within the field of play without it bouncing after the ball has touched the striker's bat or glove holding the bat, while a stumping occurs when the wicket-keeper puts down the wicket while the batsman is out of his ground and not attempting a run.
Jos Buttler is the highest-ranked English player in the list of most dismissals in T20Is as a wicket-keeper, a list headed by India's MS Dhoni and West Indian Denesh Ramdin.

Most career catches
Buttler has taken the most catches in T20Is as a wicket-keeper with Dhoni and Ramdin leading the all-time list.

Most career stumpings
Buttler has made the most stumpings in T20Is for England, with Mahendra Singh Dhoni of India and Kamran Akmal of Pakistan heading the all-time list.

Most dismissals in an innings
Five wicket-keepers have taken five dismissals in a single innings in a T20I. The feat of taking 4 dismissals in an innings has been achieved by 32 wicket-keepers on 42 occasions, with Matt Prior being the only English wicket-keeper.

Most dismissals in a series
Kenya wicket-keeper Irfan Karim holds the T20Is record for the most dismissals taken by a wicket-keeper in a series. He made 14 dismissals during the regional qualification for the 2022 T20 World Cup. The English record is held by Jos Buttler, who made 9 dismissals (all catches) in the |2022 T20 World Cup.

Fielding records

Most career catches
Caught is one of the nine methods a batsman can be dismissed in cricket. Only catches made as a fielder are included, those made as a wicket-keeper or as a substitute are excluded.

South Africa's David Miller holds the record for the most catches in T20Is by a non-wicket-keeper with 75, followed by New Zealand's Martin Guptill with 68. Eoin Morgan is the leading catcher for England, with 46.

Most catches in an innings
The feat of taking 4 catches in an innings has been achieved by 19 different fielders. The most for England is three catches, which has been achieved on eight occasions.

Most catches in a series
The 2019 ICC Men's T20 World Cup Qualifier saw the record set for the most catches taken by a non-wicket-keeper in a T20I series. Jersey's Ben Stevens and Namibia's JJ Smit each took 10 catches in the series. Liam Livingstone took six catches during the 2022 T20 World Cup, including three in the final, the most for an English fielder.

Other records

Most career matches
India's Rohit Sharma holds the record for the most T20I matches played with 147. Eoin Morgan is the most experienced English player, having represented the team on 115 occasions.

Most consecutive career matches
Scotland's Richie Berrington holds the record for the most consecutive T20I matches played with 70, a record that is ongoing  Jos Buttler and Moeen Ali share the English record with 37, a sequence that is ongoing for Ali.

Most matches as captain
MS Dhoni, who led the Indian cricket team from 2007 to 2016, and Eoin Morgan, who led England between 2012 and 2022, hold the record for the most matches played as captain in T20Is with 72. Morgan holds the world record for the most victories as captain, with 44, two of which came in Super-overs.

Youngest players on debut
The youngest player to play in a T20I match is Marian Gherasim at the age of 14 years and 16 days. Making his debut for Romania against the Bulgaria on 16 October 2020 in the first T20I of the 2020 Balkan Cup thus becoming the youngest to play in a men's T20I match.

Oldest players on debut
The Turkish batsmen Osman Göker is the oldest player to make their debut a T20I match. Playing in the 2019 Continental Cup against Romania at Moara Vlasiei Cricket Ground, Moara Vlăsiei he was aged 59 years and 181 days.

Oldest players
The Turkish batsmen Osman Göker is the oldest player to appear in a T20I match during the same above mentioned match.

Partnership records
In cricket, two batsmen are always present at the crease batting together in a partnership. This partnership will continue until one of them is dismissed, retires or the innings comes to a close.

Highest partnerships by wicket
A wicket partnership describes the number of runs scored by the two batsmen before that number wicket in the innings falls, or the innings finishes before that wicket falls.

Highest partnerships by runs
The highest T20I partnership by runs for any wicket is held by the Afghan pairing of Hazratullah Zazai and Usman Ghani who put together an opening wicket partnership of 236 runs during the Ireland v Afghanistan series in India in 2019

Highest overall partnership runs by a pair

Umpiring records

Most matches umpired
An umpire in cricket is a person who officiates the match according to the Laws of Cricket. Two umpires adjudicate the match on the field, whilst a third umpire has access to video replays, and a fourth umpire looks after the match balls and other duties. The records below are only for on-field umpires.

Aleem Dar of Pakistan holds the record for the most T20I matches umpired with 61. The most experienced English umpire is Ian Gould with 37 matches officiated so far.

See also

List of England Test cricket records
List of England One Day International cricket records
List of Twenty20 International records
List of Test cricket records
List of Cricket World Cup records

Notes

References

England in international cricket
Lists of English cricket records and statistics
England
English cricket lists